Velkov is a Bulgarian masculine surname, its feminine counterpart is Velkova. It may refer to
Anton Velkov (born 1968), Bulgarian football player and manager
Deyan Velkov (born 1981), Bulgarian football player
Katrin Velkova (born 1991), Bulgarian rhythmic gymnast
Kostadin Velkov (born 1989), Bulgarian football player
Rositsa Velkova-Zheleva (born 1972), Bulgarian politician
Sara Velkova (born 2002), Macedonian footballer
Stefan Velkov (born 1996), Bulgarian football defender

Bulgarian-language surnames